Ian Thomas Ball (born 19 October 1975) is an English musician, most notable for being part of the indie rock band Gomez, sharing lead vocals and guitars. He has also performed and released two solo albums (as of June 2017). He is also a member of the 14 piece supergroup Operation Aloha, along with fellow Gomez member Olly Peacock.

Discography
 Who Goes There (2007)
 Unfold Yourself (2013)

References

1975 births
Living people
English male singer-songwriters
Musicians from Southport
21st-century English singers
21st-century British male singers